The Republic of Poland and the Republic of Belarus established diplomatic relations on 2 March 1992. Poland was one of the first countries to recognise Belarusian independence. Both countries share a border and have shared histories, for they have been part of the Polish–Lithuanian Commonwealth and later, the Russian Empire. They joined the United Nations together in October 1945 as original members. The two countries are currently engaged in a border crisis.

Cultural relations between the two are quite friendly but diplomatic relations between the two countries are currently very strained. Poland is a member of NATO and the European Union, and has an anti-Russian stance, whereas Belarus has long been firmly pro-Russia, and as such, the separate paths by default impair the positive bilateral relationship (see Russia–European Union relations). In August 2011, the arrest of Ales Bialiatski using information from Poland led to a harsh war of words between the two countries. However, in February 2017 some tensions arose between Belarus and Russia over border controls, and Belarusian President Alexander Lukashenko expressed indignation at Russia's behaviour.

Relations between the two countries have since significantly deteriorated. In the lead-up to and during the 2020 Belarusian presidential election, a number of anti-government protests took place across the country. Belarusian authorities employed various methods of violent political crackdown, consisting of various humans rights violations; Poland strongly condemned the measures. Following Lukashenko's alleged victory for a sixth term, the European Council on 19 August decided that the elections were neither free nor fair, therefore do not recognize the results. Poland and Lithuania became two of the first countries to officially back the Belarusian opposition. Angered by this posturing, Lukashenko claimed that Belarus had closed its EU borders and had deployed additional guards and troops. In August 2021, following a sudden influx of refugees coming from Belarus, Poland deployed 15,000 troops to guard the eastern frontier with Belarus. A standoff ensued between both armies, border guards and refugees caught in between. Poland had accused Belarus of engaging in hybrid warfare, to which Poland was accused of pushing back migrants by force. By 2022, Poland had finalized the construction of a state border barrier between the two countries. In the same year, a number of Home Army monuments in Belarus were purposely destroyed. [citation needed]

Geography
Belarus and Poland share a common border (~418 km long) which is the European Union external border, which also splits the primeval Białowieża Forest between Belarusian and Polish national parks.

Poles make up 3.9% of the population of Belarus according to the 1999 Belarus Census. There were 48,700 Belarusians in Poland according to the Polish census of 2002. Both minorities represent autochthonous populations of the region and are officially recognised by their host governments.

Modern history

2020 Belarusian protests 

Amidst the 2020 Belarusian protests and Polish and Western calls for a renewed election, declaring the 2020 Belarusian presidential election invalid, Belarus deployed troops near Eastern Poland.

After the forceful suppression of Belarusian protests, the main opposition challenger Sviatlana Tsikhanouskaya  fled the country to Poland, then to Lithuania. The Polish government has allotted a villa in the Praga-Południe district of Warsaw for 10 years to be used by the Belarusian opposition. It has also given refuge to opposition leader Valery Tsepkalo. Polish Prime minister Mateusz Morawiecki has promised to provide help to the opposition, which angered president Lukashenko and his allies. Poland is also hosting the Belarusian news channel Nexta, which has played a key part in organizing the protests. The Morawiecki government has promised to give 11 million euros to Belarusian civil society and independent media.

Fallout of the 2022 Russian invasion of Ukraine
On 6 July 2022, scant months after the 2022 Russian invasion of Ukraine caused the announcement by the Morawiecki government of a major increase in funding for the Polish armed forces, the General Staff of the Armed Forces of Belarus noticed that Poland "has already repeatedly displayed its imperial ambitions and, with a support from the [US] White House, positions itself as a leader, not only in Eastern, but in Central Europe as well." Major-General Ruslan Kosygin continued: "The territory of Poland, as well as the Baltic countries, is turning into a polygon, where the USA plans to unleash another bloody conflict in Europe against the Russian Federation and its allies." He was concerned about "attempts by individual Polish politicians to initiate the return of the so-called Polish ancestral lands, which means the western regions of Ukraine and Belarus."

In 2022, Polish places of national remembrance were devastated or destroyed in Belarus, incl. Home Army monument in Stryjewka, Home Army soldiers' quarters in Mikulishki, cemetery in Surkanty, Home Army graves and commemorations in Bogdany (Yewlashy), Bobravichy, Vialikija Yodkavichy, Vawkavysk, Dyndylishki, Kachychy, Iwye, Pieskawtsy, Ashmyany and Plebanishki.

On 10 October 2022, the Polish government recommended Polish citizens leave Belarus with available commercial and private means as the relationship between the two countries has become increasingly tense. The Polish government also claims the Polish minority in Belarus is experiencing increasing repression from the state, including the imprisonment of some community leaders.

Resident diplomatic missions
 Belarus has an embassy in Warsaw, a consulate-general in Białystok and a consulate in Biała Podlaska.
 Poland has an embassy in Minsk and consulates-general in Brest and in Grodno.

See also 
 2021 Belarus–European Union border crisis
 Belarus–Poland border
 Foreign relations of Belarus
 Foreign relations of Poland

References

External links

 
Poland
Bilateral relations of Poland